The 1996 South American Artistic Gymnastics Championships were held in Santa Cruz de la Sierra, Bolivia, November 12–17, 1996.

Medalists

References

1996 in gymnastics
South American Gymnastics Championships
International gymnastics competitions hosted by Bolivia
1996 in Bolivian sport